The term badge of honour may refer to a variety of awards and accolades, including:

 Badge of Honour or Queen's Certificate and Badge of Honour, a civil award presented by the governments of British Overseas Territories.
 Order of the Badge of Honour, a civilian award of the Soviet Union.
 Badge of Honour of the Bundeswehr, a German military decoration.
 The Badge of Honour, a Jamaican award.
 British Red Cross Badge of Honour.
 An award of the Order of Vanuatu.
 The badge of the Sijil Kemuliaan, a Singaporean award.
 International Handball Federation Referee's Badge of Honour.
 Badge of Honour for Fire Protection, in Germany.
 Honour Badge of Labour, a Belgian award for exceptional workers.
 Blood Donation Badge of Honor, presented by the German Red Cross for blood donations.
 Badge of Honor (film), a 1934 American film directed by Spencer Gordon Bennet

See also
 Cross of Honour (disambiguation), various awards.
 Medal of Honor, the highest US military award.
 Order of Honour (disambiguation), various awards.

Badges
Awards